The 2000–01 Notre Dame Fighting Irish men's basketball team represented the University of Notre Dame during the 2000–01 NCAA Division I men's basketball season. They finished the regular season with a record of 20–10, 11-5. There, they defeated Xavier to advance to the Second Round. In the Second Round, they lost to the #3 seed Ole Miss, 59–56. This was Mike Brey's first year at Notre Dame.

Forward Troy Murphy was the team's captain and leading scorer, averaging 21.8 points per game.

Schedule

|-
!colspan=12 style=| Big East tournament

|-
!colspan=12 style=| NCAA tournament

Players selected in NBA drafts

References 

Notre Dame Fighting Irish
Notre Dame Fighting Irish
Notre Dame Fighting Irish men's basketball seasons
Notre Dame
Notre Dame